Bring It Back is the second album by rock/soul duo McAlmont & Butler, released in 2002 following the reunion of the duo who had split up in 1995. Playlouder ranked the album at number 37 on their list of the top 50 albums of 2002.

Track listing 
All songs written by David McAlmont and Bernard Butler.

 "Theme from 'McAlmont and Butler'" – 5:14
 "Falling" – 4:13
 "Different Strokes" – 4:17
 "Can We Make It" – 3:32
 "Blue" – 4:52
 "Bring It Back" – 4:06
 "Where R U Now?" – 4:04
 "Sunny Boy" – 3:42
 "Make it Right" – 4:04
 "Beat" – 5:58

Personnel 

 David Arnold – Conductor, String Arrangements
 Gini Ball – String Arrangements
 Brilliant Strings – Strings
 Jack Brockbank – Assistant
 Bernard Butler – Producer, Engineer, String Arrangements
 Dominic Glover – Saxophone
 Jim Hunt – Horn, Baritone saxophone
 Seb Lewsley – Engineer
 Peter Lockett – Percussion
 Billy McGee – Conductor, String Arrangements
 Makoto Sakamoto – Drums
 Nick Terry – Engineer, Mixdown Engineer
 Felix Tod – Engineer
 Kevin Westenberg – Photography
 Steve White – Drums
 Nick Woolage – Engineer, Mixdown Engineer

References

External links

Bring It Back at YouTube (streamed copy where licensed)

McAlmont & Butler albums
2002 albums
EMI Records albums
Albums produced by Bernard Butler